Neene Bari Neene is a studio album by singer Sonu Nigam. It was released in 2009, and was produced by Ashok Kheny, composed by Mano Murthy, and its lyrics were written by lyricist and writer Jayanth Kaikini.

Feature film
A film with the same name was released on 18 September 2015, starring Anish Tejeshwar, Deepika Kamaiah, and Samyukta Hornad in the lead roles. The film was directed by Deepak Thimaya and the story co-written by Vinayak Bhat. All the songs from the 2009 album have been retained in the film. The film is shot in and around Sakleshpur and Bangalore.

Track listing
All the songs are composed by Mano Murthy, performed by Sonu Nigam, and written by Jayanth Kaikini.

References

External links

Deepika to play female protagonist in her next film

2009 albums
2015 films
Indian pop
Kannada-language songs
Compositions by Mano Murthy
2010s Kannada-language films
Indian romantic musical films
2015 romance films